The 1994 UEFA European Under-21 Championship was the ninth UEFA European Under-21 Championship. The final tournament was hosted in France between 15 and 20 April 1994.

The qualification stage spanned two years from 1992 to 1994. The qualification process consisted of 32 entrants. After the two-legged quarter-final stage, France was chosen as the first hosts of the final stage, which consisted of four matches in total. The finals included for the first time a third-place play-off.

Italy won the competition for the second consecutive time. Luís Figo won the UEFA European Under-21 Championship Golden player award.

Qualification

The draw for the 1994 UEFA European Under-21 Championship qualifying round saw Czechoslovakia, France, Italy, Poland, Russia and Spain win their respective groups. Greece and Portugal qualified for the tournament as the two best runners-up. France, Italy, Portugal and Spain qualified for the 1996 Summer Olympics in the United States.

This was the last performance of Czechoslovakia, as the nation actually have split.

List of qualified teams

1 Bold indicates champion for that year

Squads

Only players born on or after 1 January 1971 were eligible to play in the tournament.

Results

Quarter-finals
The first legs were played on 9 March, and the second legs were played on 23 March 1994.

|}

First leg

Second leg

Semi-finals

Third-place play-off

Final

Goalscorers

3 goals
 João Vieira Pinto

2 goals

 Rui Costa
 Óscar
 Thomas Christiansen

1 goal

 Zdeněk Svoboda
 Christophe Dugarry
 Francis Llacer
 Nicolas Ouédec
 Pascal Nouma
 Grigoris Georgatos
 Christian Panucci
 Christian Vieri
 Paolo Negro
 Pierluigi Orlandini
 Roman Dąbrowski
 Paulo Torres
 Nélson Gama
 João Oliveira Pinto
 José Gálvez
 Julen Guerrero

Own goal
 José Miguel Prieto (playing against Greece)

Final ranking

References

External links
 Results Archive at uefa.com
 RSSSF Results Archive ''at rsssf.com

 
UEFA European Under-21 Championship
UEFA European Under-21 Championship
International association football competitions hosted by France
UEFA
April 1994 sports events in Europe
1994 in youth association football